Port Kembla is a suburb of Wollongong  10 km south of the CBD and part of the Illawarra region of New South Wales. The suburb comprises a seaport, industrial complex (one of the largest in Australia), a small harbour foreshore nature reserve, and a small commercial sector. It is situated on the tip of Red Point: its first European sighting was by Captain James Cook in 1770. The name "Kembla" is an Aboriginal word meaning "plenty [of] wild fowl".

History
Before Port Kembla was an industrial suburb of Wollongong, it was a town with a remarkably self-sufficient society, a growing commercial centre, and a vibrant civic life. Town subdivision began in 1908, and by 1921 there were 1622 residents. Economic expansion propelled further population growth. Port Kembla derives its name from its proximity to Mount Kembla.

Industrial change
A copper smelter and refinery, the Electrolytic Refinery and Smelting Company of Australia, began production in 1908, followed by the opening of Metal Manufactures in 1917 and finally the arrival of the Hoskins Iron & Steel Works in 1927. The works became Australian Iron & Steel the following year.

By 1947 the town's population had increased to 4,960 with smaller satellite suburbs such as Cringila and Lake Heights, mushrooming on its fringes. That year, 1947,  marked the climax of a local campaign for municipal autonomy which was ultimately thwarted by the creation of a Greater City of Wollongong. In the post-Second World War period there was an inexorable decline of a 'Port Kembla' society as local town boundaries were slowly but surely absorbed into a more Wollongong-focused or regional identity.

Cultural diversity
Despite the decline from the heyday of the 1920s, the town experienced major social and demographic change in the 1950s and 1960s. Waves of migrants, mostly from the United Kingdom, Italy, Macedonia and Germany, moved to the town. During this period, Port Kembla was on the cusp of changes affecting Australian society generally as new ethnic and cultural influences found a place in local society. With its long migration history accommodating waves of migrant workers and their families, Port Kembla is still one of the most culturally diverse suburbs in New South Wales.

Hill 60
Port Kembla's highest point, Hill 60, overlooks the Five Islands and Red Point. Hill 60, originally the site of an Aboriginal settlement, was used by the army during World War II to make a coastal gun emplacement known as Illowra Battery. In September 1942, Aboriginal inhabitants were forcibly evicted from the area. It has remained in the army's ownership and is now a public lookout reserve, despite a vigorous campaign to return some of the land to its Aboriginal owners. Although not technically open to tourists, the tunnels are open, and can be explored by foot. The entrance to the tunnels is located almost under the coastguard tower on Hill 60, and can be seen down the left when standing at the information board, facing southeast.

HMAS Adele loss
On 7 May 1943, Australian steamer Adele struck the breakwater at Port Kembla and was subsequently declared a total loss. The wreck of Adele is protected under the New South Wales Heritage Act, 1977.

Union Protests 
Port Kembla was the site of the Dalfram Dispute in 1938, where unionised dockworkers refused to load pig iron onto a ship heading for Japan after the Nanking Massacre. In 1974, a green ban was placed by the Builders Labourers Federation against high rise development and for the reclamation of the beach to be made a parkland.

The Jobs for Women campaign won the right for women to work at the Port Kembla steelworks. The campaign won a historic court case under the Anti-Discrimination Act and set a precedent for the employment of women in non-traditional areas of work and the interpretation of direct and indirect discrimination.

Heritage listings 
Port Kembla has a number of heritage-listed sites, including:
 Military Road: Hill 60

Population
According to the 2016 census of Population, there were  5,014 people in Port Kembla.
 Aboriginal and Torres Strait Islander people made up 3.7% of the population. 
 66.6% of people were born in Australia. The next most common countries of birth were Macedonia 9.0%, Italy 2.9% and England 2.0%.   
 66.3% of people spoke only English at home. Other languages spoken at home included Macedonian 14.7% and Italian 3.9%. 
 The most common responses for religion were Catholic 26.8%, No Religion 21.5%, Eastern Orthodox 14.9% and Anglican 10.4%.

Climate
Port Kembla has a warm oceanic climate (Cfb) with humid summers and mild, crisp winters. The suburb enjoys abundant sunshine, getting 111.4 clear days, annually.

Industry and Infrastructure

Port Kembla is known for the BlueScope steelworks operations on Springhill Road and throughout North Port Kembla. 
Other notable industrial operations in the suburb are: Port Kembla Coal Terminal, Port Kembla Copper, Incitec, Adstream Services, Port Kembla Gateway and GrainCorp.

Rail
Port Kembla has a railway station on the Port Kembla branch of the Illawarra railway line. It is the terminus of the branch line, and serves the residential area of the suburb of the same name. The station has one side platform, used for terminating trains. It is served by approximately one train per hour, usually a local service to Thirroul and Waterfall, but extra direct trains to and from Sydney are provided in the peak hours.

Pacific National operates daily coal trains to the Inner Harbour section of the port, and into the blast furnace section of the steelworks.
Downer Rail has a workshop opposite the station that services diesel powered locomotives for Pacific National.

Port
Port Kembla harbour is a major export location for coal mined in the southern and western regions of New South Wales.
As part of the state governments plan to divert ships containing auto mobiles, the port has received significant upgrades and infrastructure including a new Maritime Office and many jobs have been created as the need for port logistics grows. Patrick Corporation holds a contract for integrated port services in the harbour and transports goods by road or rail through its parent company Pacific National.

The port has a range of berths for loading coal, grain, shipping containers and other goods. As of 2020, a gas export terminal is also under development.

Sports and leisure

Sporting teams
Port Kembla has both junior and senior teams in local popular sporting leagues such as:
 Port Kembla Rugby League in the Illawarra Division Rugby league
Home grounds are Noel Mulligan Oval
 Port Kembla Cricket Club in the Cricket Illawarra Competition
Home grounds are King George V Park
 Port Kembla Soccer Club in the Illawarra Football Association
Home grounds are Darcy Wentworth Park
 Port Kembla AFL Club plays in South Coast AFL and AFL Illawarra
Home grounds are Kully Bay Park.

Port Kembla Rugby league, Port Kembla Soccer Club and Port Kembla AFL home grounds are not located in Port Kembla, they all play in parks across Warrawong.

Parks and beaches
Port Kembla has a number of parks, nature reserves, beaches and a Saltwater Olympic pool:

 King George V Park
A foreshore park located in walking distance from Port Kembla Beach. Used in summer for Port Kembla Cricket Club home games.
 Hill 60 Park
A popular take off area for hang gliders and para gliders, Hill 60 Park has BBQ facilities as well as picnic shelters, seats and tables positioned to enjoy the scenic views.
Port Kembla Beach (Or Perkins Beach) 
An award winning beach, seasonally patrolled from September to April and home to the Port Kembla Surf Life Saving Club. It's beach code is nsw379A and it has a Surf Life Saving Australia general hazard rating of 7/10  
Fishermans Beach
A small sheltered beach at the bottom of Hill 60's eastern side facing the Five Islands Nature Reserve.
North Port Kembla Beach
Also known by locals as MM Beach for its close proximity to the Metal Manufacturers site on Gloucester Boulevard. Remnants of a tidal rock pool are still standing near the southern end of the beach below the headland.

Three people died after being washed into rough surf at the popular rock fishing spot on Friday 22 January 2021.

Public transport

Train
Port Kembla has two railway stations on the Port Kembla branch of the NSW TrainLink South Coast Line.

Port Kembla railway station is the terminus of the branch line, and serves the residential area of Port Kembla. Port Kembla North serves the industrial area of the suburb. The station is the nearest to the BHP site in the area.

Both stations have a one sided platform, with the platform at Port Kembla used for terminating trains. The stations are served by approximately one train per hour, usually a local service to Thirroul, but extra direct trains to and from Sydney are provided in the peak hours.

Bus
Premier Illawarra runs three routes to and from Port Kembla railway station:

 34 – to Wollongong via Berkeley
 43 – to Dapto
 65 – to North Beach

Health and environmental issues

Port Kembla chimney stack

Port Kembla was home to one of Australia's tallest industrial chimneys, a 198 metre tall chimney built in 1965. Port Kembla Primary School was once located adjacent to it but was closed down due to pollution problems from the chimney including lead contaminated soil, acid rain and soot. A warning alarm was fitted to warn of high toxin levels. In November 2008, the Port Kembla stack was inspected and confirmed to have concrete cancer. The stack was planned to be demolished in early 2010 at a cost of A$10 million.

By 6 September 2010, plans to knock down the stack had been revised by the NSW Department of Planning. These plans included demolition of the existing Port Kembla Copper structures surrounding the chimney, excluding the locally heritage listed Precious Metals Mill Chimney and the Assay Offices. The work was due to start in the middle of 2011 with a team of 30 workers, under supervision by NSW Police, NSW WorkCover and relevant emergency services at a cost of A$8 million with an expected time frame of 16 months.

On 2 August 2013, it was announced that the stack would be demolished on Friday 6 September 2013. Due to asbestos concerns, the demolition was delayed. After no signs of danger were found, a new date was announced for the demolition: 20 February 2014.

On 20 February 2014, the copper stack was demolished.

Industrial pollution

In the past, Port Kembla's industrial heart was associated with significant industrial pollution including emissions of nitrogen oxides and other dangerous gases. However, the air quality around Port Kembla has improved dramatically over the past decade.  At nearby Kembla Grange the average concentration of nitrogen dioxide (NO2) measured by the NSW Department of Environment Climate Change halved between 2002 and 2014.

Back in the 1990s health problems were associated with noxious gases. One 1998 study of the industrial areas of Newcastle and Port Kembla found 'an important association between relatively low levels of particulate air pollution and respiratory symptoms' among primary school children.  Fallout has also introduced elevated levels of lead and other heavy metals to the soil around Port Kembla and has formed thick deposits in many buildings and industrial structures.

References

External links

 Australia's Tallest Industrial Chimney – Sightseeing with Google Satellite Maps
 PKC Stack Felling

Suburbs of Wollongong
Port cities in New South Wales
Green bans